Empire Caribou was a  cargo ship which was built in 1919 for the United States Shipping Board (USSB) as Waterbury. She was sold in 1920 to the American Star Line and renamed Northern Star. In 1923, she was sold to American Sugar Transporters Inc and renamed . In 1941 she was passed to the Ministry of War Transport (MoWT) and renamed Empire Caribou.

Description
The ship was built by Downey Shipbuilding Corporation, Arlington, New York, as yard number 10. She was launched in 1919, and completed in November that year.

Her GRT was 4,800, with a NRT of 2,999. Her DWT was 7,814. In 1940, her GRT was recorded as 4,861 and her NRT as 2,994.

The ship could make .

History
Waterbury was built for the USSB. She was launched on 23 July 1919. The United States Official Number 219134 was allocated. In 1920 she was sold to the American Star Line Inc and renamed Northern Star. In 1923, she was sold to American Sugar Transporters Inc and renamed . The Code Letters LTKB were allocated. In 1934, her Code Letters were changed to KOKC. On 18 March 1940,  was given to the United Kingdom. She was passed to the MoWT and renamed Empire Caribou. The United Kingdom Official Number 167431 and the Code Letters GQBN were allocated.

Empire Caribou was a member of a number of convoys during the Second World War.

SC 25
Convoy SC 25 departed Halifax, Nova Scotia on 10 March 1941 and arrived at Liverpool on 29 March. Empire Caribou was carrying a cargo of steel bound for London.

OB318
Convoy OB 318 departed Liverpool on  2 May 1941 and arrived at Halifax on 10 May. Empire Caribou was carrying a cargo of 2,020 tons of chalk and was bound for Boston, Massachusetts. Those lost on Empire Caribou are commemorated at the Tower Hill Memorial, London.

References

External links
Photo of Empire Caribou

1919 ships
Ships built in New York (state)
Steamships of the United States
Merchant ships of the United States
Ministry of War Transport ships
Empire ships
Steamships of the United Kingdom
Ships sunk by German submarines in World War II
Shipwrecks in the Atlantic Ocean
Maritime incidents in May 1941
Design 1025 ships